Coreus is a genus of leaf-footed bug in the Coreinae subfamily. It is the type genus for the Coreidae.

Species within this genus are:
 C. marginatus
 C. spinigerus

References

Coreini
Coreidae genera